This is a list of candidates for the 1882 New South Wales colonial election. The election was held from 30 November to 21 December 1882.

There was no recognisable party structure at this election.

Retiring Members
Robert Abbott MLA (Hartley)
Joseph Andrews MLA (Hastings and Manning)
Louis Beyers MLA (Mudgee)
John Bodel MLA (Forbes)
John Brown MLA (Patrick's Plains)
Charles Byrnes MLA (Parramatta)
Henry Dangar MLA (East Sydney)
Charles Fawcett MLA (Richmond)
Augustus Fraser MLA (Tenterfield)
James Fulford MLA (West Maitland)
William Hay MLA (Murray)
William Hezlet MLA (Paddington)
Andrew Kerr MLA (Orange)
Thomas Rutledge MLA (Queanbeyan)
William Watson MLA (Young)

Legislative Assembly
Sitting members are shown in bold text. Successful candidates are highlighted.

Electorates are arranged chronologically from the day the poll was held. Because of the sequence of polling, some sitting members who were defeated in their constituencies were then able to contest other constituencies later in the polling period. On the second occasion, these members are shown in italic text.

See also
 Members of the New South Wales Legislative Assembly, 1882–1885

References
 \

1882